Charlotte "Charlie" Covell (born circa 1984) is a British actress and writer, best known for her adaptation of the graphic comic series The End of the F***ing World for Channel 4.

Biography
Covell was born in Blackheath, London. She studied English at Oxford University.

Filmography

Actress

Writer

Producer

References

External links 

1984 births
Living people
21st-century English writers
21st-century English actresses
British film actresses
British producers
British television actresses
People from Blackheath, London
English LGBT actors
English LGBT writers
English lesbian actresses
British lesbian actresses
21st-century LGBT people